Higor Inácio Platiny de Oliveira Rodrigues (born 2 October 1990), known as Platiny , is a Brazilian footballer who plays for Portuguese club Moreirense as a forward.

Career
Born in Goiânia, Platiny started in Monte Cristo EC, in the Brazilian regional leagues. After three seasons competing in Brazil, on 29 August 2012, Platiny joined Portuguese side Feirense on a one-year deal.

In his debut professional season, he scored 9 goals, being the team fourth highest goalscorer, with one less than the top three. His performances attracted interest from larger clubs, signing with S.C. Braga in late June 2013, spending one season competing in their B-team.

A year later, Platiny joined Aves, on a loan deal from Grêmio Anápolis, scoring eight goals in over 30 caps at Vila das Aves. On 21 July 2015, he returned to Feirense for a second-spell. His performances there, earned him accolades for Segunda Liga Player of the Month in February 2016, and with 17 goals, he finished runner-up in the scoring charts, helping Feirense return to the Primeira Liga. After two years with Feirense, Platiny moved to Chaves.

References

External links

1990 births
Living people
Sportspeople from Goiânia
Brazilian footballers
Association football forwards
Brazilian expatriate footballers
Expatriate footballers in Portugal
Brazilian expatriate sportspeople in Portugal
Primeira Liga players
Liga Portugal 2 players
C.D. Feirense players
S.C. Braga players
C.D. Aves players
G.D. Chaves players
Colina Esporte Clube players
Moreirense F.C. players